Royal Birkdale Golf Club is a golf course in the United Kingdom in North West England, located in Southport, Merseyside. It is one of the clubs in the rotation for both the Open Championship and Women's British Open and has hosted the Open Championship ten times from 1954 through 2017. Winners of the Open at the course include Pádraig Harrington, Mark O'Meara, Ian Baker-Finch, Tom Watson, Johnny Miller, Lee Trevino, Arnold Palmer, Peter Thomson (twice) and Jordan Spieth.

Royal Birkdale hosted the women's tournament for a sixth time in 2014, and was the site of the Senior Open Championship in 2013. It has also hosted the Ryder Cup (1965, 1969), the Walker Cup (1951), and the Curtis Cup (1948). Other courses in the Open rota near Liverpool are Royal Liverpool Golf Club (Hoylake) and Royal Lytham & St Annes Golf Club.

On 22 July 2017, in the third round of the 2017 Open Championship, Branden Grace became the first man in major championship history to record a score of 62 in a single round.

History
Founded  as Birkdale Golf Club in 1889, the club was awarded "Royal" status in 1951. Birkdale Golf Club moved to a new site in Birkdale Hills in 1894, and built a new distinctive art deco clubhouse in 1935.  In early 1939, Birkdale was nominated as the venue for the 1940 Open Championship but the Second World War started in September 1939 and the Championship was cancelled.

In 1946, the club finally hosted its first big championship in the Amateur Championship, won by Irishman Jimmy Bruen. During the immediate postwar era, the club also hosted the 1948 Curtis Cup and the 1951 Walker Cup, both won by the United States. With these successful stagings of important events, Royal Birkdale was felt to be ready for its first Open Championship in 1954 and has continued on the Open rota ever since.

Three generations of the Hawtree family of golf course architects have worked on the course. Frederick G. Hawtree and champion golfer J.H. Taylor are the two people most responsible for the current routing, following the valleys between the very large dunes which dominate the property. The arrangement makes for excellent spectator conditions during major events. Frederick W. Hawtree, the son of Frederick G, performed some modifications in the 1960s and in 1993 Martin Hawtree, son of Frederick W., improved and modernised the layout further, with all 18 of the club's greens being completely rebuilt, to improve turf and drainage following the 1991 Open Championship. Only relatively minor tweaking, such as the addition of a few new bunkers and back tees, has been deemed necessary in advance of the last two Open Championships. The course was ranked as the 18th best in the world outside the United States, in the 2007 rankings by Golf Digest magazine.

During the 1960s, the club hosted the Ryder Cup twice, in 1965 and in 1969. The United States won in 1965 by the score of 19½–12½, but in 1969 the competition ended in a 16–16 tie when Jack Nicklaus generously conceded a short putt to Tony Jacklin to halve their match, which later became known as "The Concession." As defending champions in a tie, the U.S. retained the trophy; they kept it for another sixteen years, until 1985.

In 2013, the club hosted the Senior Open Championship.

Open Championship
The Open Championship was first held at Royal Birkdale in 1954 and has hosted ten times. 

Note: For multiple winners of The Open Championship, superscript ordinal identifies which in their respective careers.
The Open began paying in U.S. dollars in 2017, subsequent figures in pounds are rounded estimates.

Women’s British Open
Winners of the Women's British Open at Royal Birkdale.  The course was the first on the men's rota to be placed into the women's rota.

Notes
For multiple winners of the Women's British Open, superscript ordinal identifies which in their respective careers.
Years in bold signify editions that were recognised as majors by the LPGA Tour (2001–present).Since its inception in 1979, the Ladies European Tour (LET) has recognised the Women's British Open as a major.

Scorecard

Lengths of the course for previous Opens:

 2017: , par 70
 2008: , par 70
 1998: , par 70
 1991: , par 70
 1983: , par 71

 1976: , par 72
 1971: , par 73
 1965: , par 73
 1961: , par 72
 1954: , par 73

See also
List of golf clubs granted Royal status

References

External links

 
 360degree interactive course viewer

1889 establishments in England
Curtis Cup venues
Golf clubs and courses in Merseyside
Organisations based in the United Kingdom with royal patronage
Ryder Cup venues
Sport in Southport
Sports venues completed in 1889
The Open Championship venues
Walker Cup venues
Royal golf clubs